is a Japanese author of yaoi manga. Unlike Nakamura Shingiku and other female yaoi authors, she only illustrated many yaoi stories about "older Uke and younger Seme" before developing relationships between each other.

Yaoi manga Works 
 You Make My Head Spin!
 The First Stage of Love
 Love Neco
Aigan Kitty
 Reverse!?
 Unlucky Strike
 Enchanting Apple
 Petite Prince
 Oujisama 100%
 Oyaji Hiroimashita
 Papa★I Love You
Baby★I Love You
 Ikumen Datte Koishimasu
 Isso Mou, Kudokitai!
 Love Doll House Mamiya
 Radical Blood Monster
 Lover's Doll
 Ikujinashi no Kimi ni Sasageru
 Uchi no Tenshi ga Kemono Deshita
 Ore Dake Mi Nai to xx Shichau zo

References

External links 
 

Manga artists
Living people
Year of birth missing (living people)